Worth is a station on Metra's SouthWest Service in Worth, Illinois. In Metra's zone-based fare system, Worth is in zone D. As of 2018, Worth is the 119th busiest of Metra's 236 non-downtown stations, with an average of 406 weekday boardings.

As of January 16, 2023, Worth is served by 28 trains (14 in each direction) on weekdays. Saturday service is currently suspended.

Worth consists of two side platforms which serve the SouthWest Service's two tracks. There is an unattended waiting room on the inbound platform which is open from 5:00 a.m. to 10:00 a.m. Parking is available on both side of the tracks, east of Harlem Avenue (IL 43).

Bus connections
  385 87th/111th/127th 
  386 South Harlem

References

External links 

entrance from Google Maps Street View

Metra stations in Illinois
Station
Railway stations in Cook County, Illinois
Former Wabash Railroad stations